Viljandi is a town and municipality in southern Estonia with a population of 17,407 in 2019. It is the capital of Viljandi County and is geographically located between two major Estonian cities, Pärnu and Tartu. The town was first mentioned in 1283, upon being granted its town charter by Wilhelm von Endorpe. The town became a member of the Hanseatic League at the beginning of the 14th century, and is one of five Estonian towns and cities in the league.
The once influential Estonian newspaper Sakala was founded in Viljandi in 1878.

Symbols
The flag of Viljandi is bi-coloured, its upper part light blue and lower part white. The city's shield-shaped coat of arms is light blue, with a white rose in the middle. Viljandi is the white rose city – in midsummer there are 720 white roses flowering in front of the city hall, planted for the town's anniversary in 2003. In summer, the White Rose Day is celebrated in Viljandi.

History

First records of civilization in the surroundings of Viljandi date back to the 5th millennium B.C. The first written record of the earthen stronghold of Viljandi was in the year 1154 in the commentaries to al-Idrisi's world atlas Geography.

In the 12th century, a permanent settlement emerged around the stronghold of Viljandi, which also became the economic centre of the ancient Sakala district.

In 1211 the hillfort of the Estonians in Viljandi was besieged by a joint army of Germans, Latvians, and Livs. The Livonian Sword Brethren (later the Livonian Order) captured the hillfort in August 1223 from a contingent of the people of Ruthenians, who joined forces with the insurgent Estonians. 
In place of the Sakala wooden stronghold a powerful Order Centre was started in 1224. The following year the Grand Master Volquin led the construction of the Viljandi Castle at the site of the former hillfort. The Viljandi (Fellin) castle was one of the largest in the Baltic region. It was a major fortification of the Livonian Order and was appointed a commander from 1248. The fortress was continually rebuilt and modernized over the next two-hundred years.

In the 13th century, a medieval town arose on the northern side of the stronghold. The Hamburg-Riga town bylaws, lands and population of it were first recorded in 1283. During the first half of the 14th century, Viljandi joined the influential Hanseatic League – the town had become an important stop for merchants on their way to Russia and back. In 1365, the town council was party when peace between Denmark and Hansa was concluded.

In 1470, Johann Wolthus von Herse, then master of the order, took up residence in the castle. In the Middle Ages, Viljandi was a typical small commercial town, which got its main income from transit trade. The local trade and handicraft played an equally important role. In 1481, Ivan III of Russia laid siege to the castle but could not take it. The decline of Viljandi started during the Livonian War and in 1560, the forces of Knyaz Andrey Kurbsky of Muscovite Russia succeeded in seizing and demolished the town and the stronghold.

During the Polish–Russian War in the first quarter of the 17th century, the town and the stronghold were completely destroyed. Under the Swedish rule in the 17th century the town bylaws of Viljandi were cancelled.

After the Great Northern War, Russians seized the power and Viljandi was without laws until the year 1783, when in the course of the regency reforms of Catherine II Viljandi became a district town. This involved the re-establishment of town bylaws. The economic and political importance of Viljandi started to increase. The population, meanwhile, having decreased to the minimum, started to rise again; handicraft, trading and cultural life were enlivened.

In 2005, Estonian Match, the successor of the 100-year-old Viljandi Match Factory, made a six-metre match, which was registered as the largest match in the world in the Guinness Book of Records.

Religion

Geography

The town is situated on the north-western shore of Lake Viljandi, which lies in the primeval valley. Green zones cover 27% of the town area. Public green areas cover about 418 ha, including 92 ha of parks. The largest is the nature-protected Castle Park, but also Valuoja Park, Kiigepark, Uueveski Park are worth mentioning. The main tree species are oak, lime, birch, and pine. The grandest tree-lined avenues are Maramaa (named after August Maramaa, twice the mayor of Viljandi) and Lembitu avenues. Among foreign species, American larch can be found in Köler avenue and Douglas fir in Uus street.

Culture
Viljandi is sometimes called the cultural capital of Estonia, partly due to the Viljandi Culture Academy being located there.

Ugala Theatre since 1920, Viljandi has had the Ugala drama theatre. The tradition of open-air performances dates back to the same year.

Viljandi Puppet Theatre

Sakala Centre

Viljandi Library built in 2002 is also a venue for exhibitions, meetings with famous people, culture seminars, etc.

Kondas Centre is dedicated to Estonian naïve artist Paul Kondas. The center hosts exhibitions of representatives of naïvism and is also a meeting place for artistic people.

Estonian Traditional Music Centre located in the Traditional Music Storehouse, a restored store house on Kirsimägi in the Castle ruins. The mission of the center is to promote and teach traditional music.

Economy

There were 871 businesses in Viljandi on 1 May 2005, 50% of them in service, 45% in trade, and 5% in production areas. The major industries represented are the construction materials industry, textile industry, and food and bakery industry. In 2005, the Investor of the Year title was awarded to the waterworks operator AS Viljandi Veevärk, the Employer award to AS Toom Tekstiil, and the Sponsor of the Year title to AS Viljandi Metall. Unemployment rate among the working-age population in Viljandi was about 3%.

Transport

At the moment, 3 modes of transport can be used – free local buses, road and rail. One of the most important is the Viljandi railway station, which was opened in 1897, through which the Lelle-Viljandi railway and the Viljandi-Mõisaküla railway pass.

Climate

Education
There are 7 schools and 7 kindergartens in Viljandi, a vocational secondary school and a university college. Special interests are catered for by a variety of institution providing extracurricular studies and activities in such fields as sports, music etc. The Youth Centre of Viljandi County is successful in offering various information and consulting services.

Schools in Viljandi
Primary Schools
 Viljandi Jakobsoni Kool
 Viljandi Kesklinna Kool
 Viljandi Paalalinna Kool

 Viljandi Kaare Kool
 Viljandi Vaba Waldorfkool

Grammar Schools
 Viljandi Gümnaasium
 Viljandi Täiskasvanute Gümnaasium

Vocational education
Vocational education can be acquired at Viljandi Joint Vocational Secondary School.

Higher education
Higher and applied higher education can be acquired at Viljandi Culture Academy a college of the University of Tartu.

Extracurricular educational institutions
 Viljandi Music School
 Viljandi Sports School
 Viljandi Art School
 Viljandi Youth Hobby Centre

Sports
There are sports events in Viljandi for both top athletes and amateurs. Family sports events, Sunday skiing trips, cycling tours in spring and autumn are very popular. In the city there are 53 sports clubs, a large sports hall and the new sports hall of Maagümnaasium. Also, the country's first artificial speed skating oval was opened in 2014. Soon, the jogging and cycling track around Lake Viljandi will be completed. A new skateboarding and roller-skating area has been built in Männimäe. At the lakeside are tennis courts and the city stadium.

Several races are held in Viljandi – around Lake Viljandi and Lake Paala and up and down the Trepimägi stairs. The longest tradition – the race around Lake Viljandi has been organised since 1928. This race takes place annually on 1 May, with the number of participants being about 1300 in the recent years. The winners' names are cut into stone columns. The legendary Hubert Pärnakivi, whose monument is also a tribute to the race, was an 11-time winner of the race.

Other popular fields of sport in Viljandi are handball, football, volleyball, basketball, wrestling, archery and rowing.

Legends

Boatman of Viljandi
Often the popular song is sung about the Boatman of Viljandi or the legend of him is told. Long-long ago, as a young man he had once taken a young girl across the lake on a summer evening and fallen hopelessly in love with the girl's blue eyes. Nobody knows what happened on the lake, but on the other side, the girl just waved him good-bye and left... However, the Boatman, a grey old man now, is said to row on the lake to this day, longing to see those wonderful blue eyes again.

According to another story, it was a boatman from Gauja who had dedicated a song to his loved one. As the young woman had moved near Viljandi, the song had changed, too.

International relations
Viljandi as historic Hanseatic town is a member of the international City League the Hanse.

Twin towns – sister cities

Viljandi is twinned with:

 Ahrensburg, Germany
 Cumberland, United States
 Eslöv, Sweden
 Frostburg, United States
 Härnösand, Sweden
 Kretinga, Lithuania
 Porvoo, Finland
 Telavi, Georgia
 Ternopil, Ukraine
 Valmiera, Latvia

Events
 Viljandi Folk Music Festival a music festival with a focus on European folk music. It is traditionally held in the end of July. In the year 2006, over 24,000 people attended the concerts. As such, it is the largest annual music festival in Estonia. Due to this, Viljandi is sometimes called the Estonian Capital of Folk Music.
 Early Music Festival
 Notafe Festival – originally 'Noore Tantsu (Young Dance) Festival' :  Annual experimental theater festival founded in 1993, traditionally held in mid July.
 Winter Folk Dance Festival
 "Theatre in Suitcase" puppet theatre festival
 Rock Ramp Festival
 Viljandi Hanseatic Days are traditionally held in June every year. The program covers different activities and events like a Hanseatic fair, where people can buy and sell traditional goods. The Viljandi Hanseatic Days also offer concerts and live performances from local and foreign performers. Different workshops are opened. Medieval sports games take place by the Lake Viljandi.
 International Hanseatic Days will be held in Viljandi from 2015.
 Grand Race around Lake Viljandi

Notable residents
Ülle Aaskivi (1950–2007), Estonian politician
Liisa Aibel (born 1972), Estonian actress
August Alle (1890–1952), Estonian author
Stefan Airapetjan (born 1997), singer who represented Estonia in the Eurovision Song Contest 2022
Meelis Atonen (born 1966), Estonian politician
Franz Burchard Dörbeck (1799–1835), Baltic-German caricaturist and painter
August Eller (1907–1990), Estonian chess player
Väino Ilus (born 1929), Estonian writer
Kaido Kama (born 1957), Estonian politician
Triinu Kivilaan (born 1989), former bassist of the band Vanilla Ninja, now soloist
Ragnar Klavan (born 1985), Estonian footballer and captain of the Estonia national team, played for Liverpool and in Cagliari   
Mart Laar (born 1960), Estonian politician
Karin Luts (1904–1993), Estonian artist
Mait Malmsten (born 1972), Estonian actor
Karol Mets (born 1993), Estonian footballer
Uno Naissoo (1928–1980), Estonian composer and music pedagogue
Annely Peebo (born 1971), Estonian opera singer (mezzo-soprano)
Eric Pehap (1912–1981), abstract artist
 (1832–1907), journalist, teacher, author
Sander Post (born 1984), Estonian football player
Joakim Puhk (1888–1942), Estonian entrepreneur and sports official
Tõnis Rätsep (born 1947), Estonian actor, musician, playwright and educator
Hans Schmidt (1854–1923), German musician (composer and pianist) and poet
Elisabeth Schiemann (1881–1972), German geneticist and crop scientist
Helir-Valdor Seeder (born 1964), Estonian politician
Sirje Tamul (born 1951), Estonian historian
Jaan Tätte (born 1964), Estonian dramatist, actor and singer
Joonas Tamm (born 1992), International Estonian football player for Desna Chernihiv and Sampdoria.

Gallery

See also
 Lake Viljandi
 Viljandi castle
 University of Tartu Viljandi Culture Academy

References

Heinrici (ca. 1187–1259) Chronicon Livoniae see also Chronicle of Henry of Livonia

External links

 
 Viljandi Tourist Information Centre
 Festival Viljandi Folk Music Festival
 Viljandi this week, Nädal Viljandis, all events in Viljandi
 Awarded "EDEN - European Destinations of Excellence" non traditional tourist destination 2008

 
Cities and towns in Estonia
Municipalities of Estonia
Members of the Hanseatic League
Kreis Fellin
Populated places in Viljandi County
Populated places established in the 1280s